Sacred Heart Academy High School is a Roman Catholic parish parochial school in Mount Pleasant, Michigan, United States.  It is located in the Roman Catholic Diocese of Saginaw and serves grades K-12.

Demographics
The demographic breakdown of the 415 students enrolled for 2017-18 was:

Native American/Alaskan - 1.4%
Asian - 3.6%
Black - 2.7%
Hispanic - 2.2%
White - 85.1%
Multiracial - 5.0%

Athletics 
Sacred Heart Academy's Irish compete in the Mid-State Activities Conference. School colors are red, white and green. The following Michigan High School Athletic Association (MHSAA) sanctioned sports are offered:

Baseball (boys) 
Basketball (girls and boys) 
Cross country (girls and boys) 
Football (boys) 
Golf (girls and boys) 
Softball (girls) 
Swim and dive (girls) 
Track and field (girls and boys) 
Volleyball (girls) 
Soccer (girls)

References

External links

Roman Catholic Diocese of Saginaw
Catholic secondary schools in Michigan
Sacred Heart schools in the United States
Schools in Isabella County, Michigan
Educational institutions established in 1889
Private middle schools in Michigan
Private elementary schools in Michigan
1889 establishments in Michigan